The Changan CS35 Plus is a subcompact crossover produced by Changan Automobile positioned slightly above the Changan CS35 as a slightly more premium model.

Overview

The Changan CS35 Plus debuted on the 2018 Chengdu Auto Show with prices ranging from 69,900 yuan to 104,900 yuan and the official market launch in October 2018.

The CS35 Plus was originally planned to be the replacement of the CS35 during development phase, however the plan was changed and the previously launched CS35 was now positioned slightly lower in the market but remained to be in production. The lone engine option of the CS35 Plus at launch is a 1.6 liter engine producing 117 horsepower.

2021 facelift
A facelift of the CS35 Plus was launched in January 2021, featuring redesigned front down road graphics and rear end styling to be more inline with the latest Changan vehicles. 

The updated model is powered by a 1.6 liter natural aspirated engine codenamed "JL478QEP" producing . Transmission options includes a 5-speed manual gearbox, CVT (simulating 8 gears) and a 6-speed automatic transmission.

As of March 2021, the official announcement introduced a 1.4 liter turbo engine also available starting from the 2021 model year developing  and  mated to a 7-speed wet DCT.

References

External links
 

2010s cars
Cars introduced in 2018
Cars of China
CS35 Plus
Crossover sport utility vehicles
Front-wheel-drive vehicles
Mini sport utility vehicles